Digitus tertius or third digit can refer to:
 Middle finger (digitus tertius manus)
 Third toe (digitus tertius pedis)